A blank expression is a facial expression characterized by neutral positioning of the facial features, implying a lack of strong emotion. It may be caused by a lack of emotion, depression, boredom or slight confusion, such as when a listener does not understand what has been said.

Another possible cause for a blank expression is traumatic brain injury such as a concussion. If someone has just been hit on the head and retains a blank or dazed expression, this can be an early warning of a concussion.

Psychiatric disorders such as schizophrenia, facial paralysis, and post-traumatic stress disorder, may also cause a blank expression. If medical conditions such as these are the cause of the blank expression, medication and therapy may be used as treatment to regain normal expression.

Poker face 
A deliberately-induced blank expression meant to conceal one's emotions is also known as a poker face, referring to the common practice of maintaining one's composure when playing the card game poker. This term comes from the special language used in poker, and is not only about your facial expression but also other extraneous movements that could give insight into what you are feeling, such as clenching fists, bouncing a leg, or constant repositioning of your body and or cards. If someone has expressed that you have a poker face, it generally tends to mean that you are hard to read and they do not know what you are thinking.

The first recorded publication of the term poker face is from the 1875 book "Cavendish. Round games at cards." which reads "It follows that the possession of a good poker face is an advantage. No one who has any pretensions to good play will betray the value of his hand by gesture, change of countenance, or any other symptom."

The term poker face was used outside the game of poker by American sportswriters in the 1920s to describe a competitor who appeared unaffected by stressful situations (an important skill when playing poker for money, to avoid giving an opponent any tells about one's hand). It is similarly used with reference to marketers and salespeople during business negotiations.

See also 

 Catatonia
 Deadpan
 Highway hypnosis
 Poker face (disambiguation)
 Reduced affect display
 Resting bitch face
 Thousand-yard stare

References

General references

Inline citations 

Facial expressions
Poker gameplay and terminology